Samuel Ernest Whitnall (March 30, 1876 – February 19, 1950) was an English doctor, anatomist and humorist. He is known for his work on orbital anatomy, having described the Whitnall ligament and the Whitnall tubercle. He was also distinguished for writing one of only known examples from the era of a parody of medical guides for students.

Whitnall earned his doctorate at Oxford. He worked there from 1908-1919 as demonstrator of anatomy, eventually joining the Royal College of Physicians, London. He later taught at McGill University as a professor of anatomy.

Selected works
Astonishing Anatomy (published under the pseudonym "Tingle" in 1913)
The anatomy of the human orbit and accessory organs of vision (Hodder & Staughton, 1921)
The Study of Anatomy (Williams & Wilkins Co, 1939)

References

1876 births
1950 deaths
English anatomists
English humorists